Moorella is a genus of bacteria belonging to the phylum Bacillota.

These bacteria are thermophilic, anaerobic and endospore-forming and many species of this genus have been isolated from  hot springs.
Some of these species were formerly included within the genus Clostridium, but after a taxonomic rearrangement of the class Clostridia, a phylogenetically distinct genus was identified, which was named Moorella in honor of the American microbiologist W.E.C. Moore.

Phylogeny
The current phylogeny of these bacteria has been inferred from a computational analysis of 16S ribosomal RNA genes of described species belonging to the Moorella Group (a larger group of bacteria within the family Thermoanaerobacteraceae that also includes other species actually not belonging to genus Moorella). The currently accepted taxonomy is based on the List of Prokaryotic names with Standing in Nomenclature (LPSN) and National Center for Biotechnology Information (NCBI)

See also
 List of bacterial orders
 List of bacteria genera

References

Thermoanaerobacterales
Bacteria genera
Thermophiles
Anaerobes